The Kuru-Köl Forest Reserve (also Курукол Kurukol) is located in the Ala-Buka rural community, Ala-Buka District, Jalal-Abad Region, Kyrgyzstan. It was established in 1975 with a purpose of conservation of Schrenk's Spruce (Picea schrenkiana). Among other trees growing in the forest reserve are wild ash, maple, hawthorn, barberry, etc.  The forest reserve occupies 348 hectares.

References

Protected areas established in 1975
Forest reserves of Kyrgyzstan